Rudas is a Hungarian word and surname, literally meaning "of rúd, pole-horse with carriage, wagon" ( "pole, rod, beam, (wagon with) drawbar"):

People with the surname Rudas
  (né (~1883) Reichenthal),  (1856, (Nagy-)Tany – 1912), a Jewish Hungarian (Austro-Hungarian)- Transylvanian physician
 László Rudas (né Róth),  (1885, Sárvár – 1950, Budapest), a Hungarian communist newspaper editor and politician
 Ferenc Rudas (né Ruck),  (born 1921, Budapest), Hungarian football player, -coach, sport leader
 Tibor Rudas,  (born 1926, Budapest), a Hungarian entrepreneur
 Márta Bajcsay-Rudas(-Antal), née Antal,  (1937–2017), a Hungarian track and field athlete
 ,  (1944, Budapest – 2010, Vienna), a Hungarian-Austrian psychiatrist
 ,  (born 1953, Budapest), a Hungarian-Austrian media manager and politician
  (born 1981, Vienna), an Austrian politician (SPÖ)

People with the surname Rudaś 
  (born 1981, Warsaw), Polish singer of pop music, reggae, ethnic, and soul music

See also 
 Rudas Baths, a thermal and medicinal bath in Budapest; Magyariyed from Bosniak and Turkish "rudna ilidže" (bath-bath).
 Horse-drawn vehicle
 Carriage
 Wagonette
 Vardo (Romani wagon)
 Ruda

Related surnames
 Szekeres

References

External links

Hungarian words and phrases
Animal-powered vehicles
Hungarian-language surnames
Occupational surnames